Southern Boulevard is a street in the Bronx, New York City, United States. It stretches from Bruckner Boulevard in Mott Haven to Bronx Park East in Allerton where it becomes Allerton Avenue. From 1981 until 2011, the portion north of Fordham Road, adjacent to the New York Botanical Garden, was also named Dr. Theodore L. Kazimiroff Boulevard. In 2011, the name of Kazimiroff, a Bronx historian and a founder of The Bronx County Historical Society, was changed to an honorary designation for this portion of Southern Boulevard after the New York City Department of Transportation, having been lobbied by Fordham University, decided that the designation was little known and confusing to those unfamiliar with the area.

The  trains run directly above Southern Boulevard from Simpson Street to 174th Street. The  trains also run under Southern Boulevard from East 143rd Street to Hunts Point Avenue. The Bx9 and Bx19 also serve Southern Boulevard, with the Bx19 serving Southern Boulevard between East 149th Street and New York Botanical Garden and the Bx9 serving Southern Boulevard between East 180th Street and Fordham Road. The Bx5 and Bx26 serve short portions of the street.

See also
Southern Boulevard Railroad

References

External links
 

Streets in the Bronx